Blink-182 (stylized as blink-182) is an American rock band formed in Poway, California in 1992. Their current lineup consists of bassist/vocalist Mark Hoppus, guitarist/vocalist Tom DeLonge, and drummer Travis Barker. Though their sound has diversified throughout their career, their musical style, described as pop-punk, blends catchy pop melodies with fast-paced punk rock. Their lyrics center on relationships, adolescent frustration, and maturity—or lack thereof. The group emerged from a suburban, Southern California skate-punk scene and gained notoriety for high-energy live shows and irreverent humor.

After years of independent recording and touring, including stints on the Warped Tour, the group signed to MCA Records. Their biggest albums, Enema of the State (1999) and Take Off Your Pants and Jacket (2001), saw international success. Songs like "All the Small Things", "Dammit", "I Miss You", and "What's My Age Again?" became hit singles and MTV staples. Later efforts, including an untitled album (2003), marked stylistic shifts. Hoppus is the only member to remain in the band throughout its entire history. DeLonge left the group twice, both times a decade apart, before eventually returning. Founding drummer Scott Raynor recorded and toured with the group before being dismissed in 1998, with Barker taking his place from that point on. From 2015 to 2022, the band included Alkaline Trio singer/guitarist Matt Skiba, with whom they recorded two albums, California (2016) and Nine (2019) and toured in support of both.

Blink-182's straightforward approach and simple arrangements, which helped initiate pop-punk's mainstream rise, made them popular among generations of listeners. Worldwide, the group has sold 50 million albums and moved 13 million copies in the U.S.

History

Formation and initial years (1992–1994)

Blink-182 was formed in August 1992 in Poway, California, a northern suburb of San Diego. Guitarist Tom DeLonge was expelled from Poway High for being drunk at a basketball game and was forced to attend another school, Rancho Bernardo High School, for one semester. There, he performed at a Battle of the Bands competition, where he was introduced to drummer Scott Raynor. He also befriended Kerry Key, who was also interested in punk rock music. Key was dating Anne Hoppus, sister of bassist Mark Hoppus, who had recently moved from Ridgecrest, California, to work at a record store and attend college. Both Hoppus and DeLonge grew up listening to punk rock music, with both particularly enamored by the Descendents. Southern California had a large punk population in the early 1990s, aided by an active surfing, skating, and snowboarding scene. In contrast to East Coast punk music, the West Coast wave of groups typically introduced more melodic aspects to the group's music. "New York is gloomy, dark and cold. It makes different music. The Californian middle-class suburbs have nothing to be that bummed about," said DeLonge.

Anne introduced her brother to DeLonge on August 2, 1992. The pair instantly connected and played for hours in DeLonge's garage, exchanging lyrics and co-writing songs—one of which became fan favorite "Carousel". Hoppus, hoping to impress DeLonge, fell from a lamppost in front of DeLonge's home and cracked his ankles, putting him in crutches for three weeks. The trio began to practice together in Raynor's bedroom, spending time writing music, seeing movies and punk concerts, and playing practical jokes. The trio first operated under a variety of names, including Duck Tape and Figure 8, until DeLonge rechristened the band "Blink". Hoppus' girlfriend of the time was annoyed by his constant attention to the band, and demanded he make a choice between the band and her, which resulted in Hoppus leaving the band not long after its formation. Shortly thereafter, DeLonge and Raynor borrowed a four-track recorder from friend and collaborator Cam Jones and were preparing to record a demo tape, with Jones on bass. Hoppus promptly broke up with his girlfriend and returned to the band. Flyswatter—a combination of original songs and punk covers—was recorded in Raynor's bedroom in May 1993.

The band began booking shows, and were on stage nearly every weekend, even at Elks Lodges and YMCA centers. DeLonge called clubs constantly in San Diego asking for a spot to play, as well as local high schools, convincing them that Blink was a "motivational band with a strong antidrug message" in hopes to play at an assembly or lunch. San Diego at this time was "hardly a hotbed of [musical] activity", according to journalist Joe Shooman, but the band's popularity grew as did punk rock concurrently in the mainstream. They quickly became part of a circuit that also included bands such as Ten Foot Pole and Unwritten Law, and Blink soon found its way onto the bill as the opening band for acts performing at Soma, a local all-ages venue. "The biggest dreams we ever had when we started was to [headline] a show at Soma," Hoppus said later. Meanwhile, Hoppus' manager at the record store, Patrick Secor, fronted the group money to properly record another demo at a local studio Doubletime. The result was Buddha (1994), which the members of the band viewed as the band's first legitimate release. That year, however, Raynor's family relocated to Reno, Nevada, and he was briefly replaced by musician Mike Krull. The band saved money and began flying Raynor out to shows, and he eventually moved back and in with Hoppus in mid-1995. During that time, the band would record its first album, first music video, and develop a larger following.

Early releases and touring (1995–1998)

The heart of the local independent music scene was Cargo Records, which offered to sign the band on a "trial basis," with help from O, guitarist for local punk band Fluf, and Brahm Goodis, a friend of the band whose father was president of the label. Hoppus was the only member to sign the contract, as DeLonge was at work at the time and Raynor was still a minor. The band recorded their debut album—Cheshire Cat, released in February 1995—in three days at Westbeach Recorders in Los Angeles, fueled by both new songs and re-recordings of songs from previous demos. "M+M's", the band's first single, garnered local radio airplay from 91X, and Cargo offered the band a small budget to film a music video for it. Meanwhile, the record also drew the attention of Irish band Blink. Unwilling to engage in a legal battle, the band agreed to change their name. Cargo gave the band a week, but the trio put off the decision for more than two afterward. Eventually, Cargo called the trio, demanding that they "change the name or [we'll] change it for you," after which the band decided on a random number, 182.

The band soon hired a manager, Rick DeVoe, who had worked with larger bands such as NOFX, Pennywise and The Offspring. In addition, the group drew the attention of Rick and Jean Bonde of the Tahoe booking agency, who were responsible for "spreading the name of the band far and wide." In late 1995, the trio embarked on their first national tour, promoting the surf video GoodTimes with Unwritten Law, Sprung Monkey and 7 Seconds. GoodTimes was directed by filmmaker Taylor Steele, who was a friend of DeVoe. In preparation for the trek, the band members purchased their own tour van, which they nicknamed the Millennium Falcon. The GoodTimes tour extended outside the States with a leg in Australia; the trio were financially unable to go, but Pennywise's members paid for their plane tickets. Fletcher Dragge, guitarist of Pennywise, believed in the band strongly. He demanded that Kevin Lyman, founder of the traveling rock-based Warped Tour, sign the band for its 1996 iteration, predicting they would become "gigantic." That year, the band toured heavily, with several domestic shows on and off the Warped Tour, trips to Canada and Japan, and more Australian dates. Australia was particularly receptive to the band and their humorous stage antics, which gained the band a reputation, but also made them ostracized and considered a joke.

By March 1996, the trio began to accumulate a genuine buzz among major labels, resulting in a bidding war between Interscope, MCA and Epitaph. MCA promised the group complete artistic freedom and ultimately signed the band, but Raynor held a great affinity for Epitaph and began to feel half-invested in the band when they chose MCA. The group, discouraged by Cargo's lack of distribution and faith in the group, held no qualms about signing to a major label but were fiercely criticized in the punk community. After nonstop touring, the trio began recording their follow-up LP, Dude Ranch, over the period of a month in late 1996 with producer Mark Trombino. The record saw release the following June, and the band headed out on the 1997 Warped Tour. "Dammit", the album's second single, received heavy airplay on modern rock stations. Dude Ranch shipped gold by 1998, but an exhaustive touring schedule brought tensions among the trio. Raynor had been drinking heavily to offset personal issues, and he was fired by DeLonge and Hoppus in mid-1998 despite agreeing to attend rehab and quit drinking. Travis Barker, drummer for tour-mate The Aquabats, filled in for Raynor, learning the 20-song setlist in 45 minutes before the first show. By July, he joined the band full-time and later that year, the band entered the studio with producer Jerry Finn to begin work on their third album.

Mainstream breakthrough and continued success (1999–2004)

With the release of the group's third album Enema of the State in June 1999, Blink-182 was catapulted to stardom and became one of the biggest pop-punk acts of the era. Three singles were released from the record—"What's My Age Again?", "All the Small Things", and "Adam's Song"—which became major radio hits. "All the Small Things" became a number-one hit on the Modern Rock Tracks chart, and also became a crossover hit, peaking at number six on the Billboard Hot 100 chart. The band's relationship with MTV cemented their status as video stars; all three singles became staples on the network and TRL mainstays. Enema of the State was an enormous commercial success, although the band was criticized as synthesized, manufactured pop only remotely resembling punk, and pigeonholed as a joke act due to the puerile slant of their singles and associated videos. The album has sold over 15 million copies worldwide and had a considerable effect on pop-punk music, inspiring a "second wave" of the genre and numerous acolytes.

Following that success, as well as their first arena tour and cameo appearances in film and TV (American Pie), the band recorded their fourth album, the comically titled Take Off Your Pants and Jacket (2001). It became their first number one album in the U.S., Canada, and Germany, and spawned the singles "The Rock Show", "Stay Together for the Kids" and "First Date". Jerry Finn returned to produce the record and was a key architect of the "polished" pop-punk sound; according to journalist James Montgomery, writing for MTV News, the veteran engineer "served as an invaluable member of the Blink team: part adviser, part impartial observer, he helped smooth out tensions and hone their multiplatinum sound." Recording sessions were sometimes contentious, as DeLonge strove for heavier-sounding guitar riffs. With time off from touring, he felt a desire to broaden his musical palette, and channeled his chronic back pain and resulting frustration into Box Car Racer (2002), an LP that emulates his post-hardcore influences, such as Fugazi and Refused. He invited Barker to record drums for the project, in order to refrain from hiring a studio musician. Box Car Racer rapidly evolved into a side project for the duo, launching the singles "I Feel So" and "There Is", in addition to two national tours throughout 2002. Though DeLonge claimed Hoppus was not intentionally left out, Hoppus felt betrayed, and the event created great division within the trio for some time and was an unresolved tension at the forefront of the band's later hiatus. In the meantime, Barker also parlayed his love of hip-hop into the rap rock outfit Transplants, a collaboration with Rancid's Tim Armstrong.

The band regrouped in 2003 to record its fifth studio album, infusing experimentalist elements into its usual pop punk sound, inspired by lifestyle changes (the band members all became fathers before the album was released) and side projects. Blink-182 was released in November 2003 through Geffen Records, which absorbed sister label MCA earlier that year. The worldwide touring schedule, which saw the band travel to Japan and Australia, also found the three performing for troops stationed in the Persian Gulf during the first year of the Iraq War. Critics generally complimented the new, more "mature" direction taken for the album and its lead singles "Feeling This" and "I Miss You" charted high, with the latter becoming the group's second number one hit on the Billboard Modern Rock Tracks chart. Fans, however, were split by the new direction, and tensions within the band—stemming from the grueling schedule and DeLonge's desire to spend more time with his family—started to become evident.

Hiatus, side projects, and Barker's plane crash (2005–2008)
In February 2005, Geffen issued a press statement announcing the band's "indefinite hiatus." The band had broken up after members' arguments regarding their future and recording process. DeLonge felt increasingly conflicted both about his creative freedom within the group and the toll touring was taking on his family life. He eventually expressed his desire to take a half-year respite from touring in order to spend more time with family. Hoppus and Barker were dismayed by his decision, which they felt was an overly long break. Rehearsals for a benefit concert grew contentious, rooted in the trio's increasing bitterness toward one another. DeLonge considered his bandmates' priorities "mad, mad different," coming to the conclusion that the trio had simply grown apart as they aged, had families, and reached fame. The breakdown in communication led to heated exchanges, resulting in his exit from the group.

DeLonge briefly disappeared from public eye, making no appearances, granting no interviews and remaining silent until September 2005, when he announced his new project, Angels & Airwaves, promising "the greatest rock and roll revolution for this generation." He later revealed he was addicted to painkillers at the time for his chronic back pain, noting that his grandiose statements seemed outlandish. The group released two albums in 2006 and 2007: the RIAA gold-certified We Don't Need to Whisper and I-Empire. At the same time, Hoppus and Barker also continued playing music together, forming the supergroup +44. +44's debut, When Your Heart Stops Beating, was released in 2006 but stalled commercially and received mixed reviews. Meanwhile, Barker starred in the MTV reality series Meet the Barkers with his then-wife, former Miss USA Shanna Moakler. The couple's later split, reconciliation and subsequent breakup made them tabloid favorites. Barker also launched a shoe line and worked on hip-hop remixes, as well as with the Transplants and TRV$DJAM, a collaboration with friend Adam Goldstein (DJ AM). During the hiatus, Hoppus shifted his attention to hosting a podcast and producing albums (most notably Commit This to Memory by former tour-mate Motion City Soundtrack).

The band members did not speak from their breakup until 2008. That August, former producer Jerry Finn suffered a cerebral hemorrhage and died. The following month, Barker and Goldstein were involved in a plane crash that killed four people, leaving them the only two survivors. Barker sustained second and third degree burns and developed post-traumatic stress disorder, and the accident resulted in sixteen surgeries and multiple blood transfusions. Goldstein's injuries were less severe, but the following year, he died from a drug overdose. Hoppus was alerted about Barker's accident by a phone call in the middle of the night and jumped on the next flight to the burn center. DeLonge quickly reached out to his former bandmate, mailing him a letter and photograph. The trio eventually met up in the hospital, laying the grounds for what was going to be the band's reunion. Eventually, an arrangement was made for the trio to meet up at Hoppus and Barker's Los Angeles studio in October 2008. The three opened up, discussing the events of the hiatus and their break-up, and DeLonge was the first to approach the subject of reuniting. Hoppus remembered: "I remember [Tom] said, 'So, what do you guys think? Where are your heads at?' And I said, 'I think we should continue with what we've been doing for the past 17 years. I think we should get back on the road and back in the studio and do what we love doing.

Reunion years (2009–2014)

For the first time in nearly five years, the band appeared on stage together as presenters at the February 2009 Grammy Awards, and announced their reunion. The trio embarked on a reunion tour of North America from July to October 2009, with a European trek following from August to September 2010. Barker, suffering from a fear of flying after his accident, traveled via bus domestically and by an ocean liner for overseas dates. The recording process for Neighborhoods, the band's sixth studio album, was stalled by its studio autonomy, tours, managers, and personal projects. DeLonge recorded at his studio in San Diego while Hoppus and Barker recorded in Los Angeles—an extension of their strained communication. The self-produced album—their first without Jerry Finn since Enema of the State—was released in September 2011 and peaked at number two on the Billboard 200. Its singles—"Up All Night" and "After Midnight"—only attracted modest chart success, and label Interscope was reportedly disappointed with album sales.The band continued to tour in the early 2010s, "despite growing evidence of remaining friction" between the members, according to AllMusic biographer John Bush. They headlined the 10th Annual Honda Civic Tour in North America in 2011 with My Chemical Romance, and launched a 20th Anniversary Tour the next year. For that tour, the band played in Europe twice, North America, and Australia; drummer Brooks Wackerman filled-in for Barker, as he was not yet ready to fly. Additionally, the trio pursued a tenth anniversary celebration of Blink-182 with a series of shows, and played the Reading and Leeds Festivals; it was the band's fourth appearance at the festival and second headlining slot. The band also parted ways with longtime label Interscope, self-releasing their next project, Dogs Eating Dogs, an EP. DeLonge's final performance with the group was at the Wine Amplified Festival in Las Vegas, Nevada on October 11, 2014.
The reunion of the band has been characterized as dysfunctional by both Barker and DeLonge. Hoppus commented on this era of the band in a later interview: "Everything was always very contentious. There was always just a strange vibe. [...] I knew there was something wrong." In his memoir, Can I Say, Barker claims DeLonge's behavior on tour was "introverted" until "money started coming in," after which "he'd get excited about Blink." He states DeLonge abruptly quit sometime in mid-2014, and rejoined the following day.

DeLonge's second exit and Matt Skiba era (2015–2020)

The group planned to begin writing their seventh album in January 2015, which had continually seen delays. "I'd do interviews and I just felt awful for fans because they were promised albums for years and we couldn't do it," Barker later said. A record deal was finalized and sessions were booked before DeLonge's manager informed the band he intended to spend more time on "non-musical activities" and indefinitely depart the group. In his own statement, DeLonge remarked that he "Never planned on quitting, [I] just find it hard as hell to commit." After these events, Barker summarized the band's reunion: "Why Blink even got back together in the first place is questionable." Initially, the reason behind DeLonge's departure was not made clear until Barker revealed in 2019 that the guitarist wanted to pursue his company To the Stars... Academy of Arts & Sciences full-time, which is devoted to investigating UFOs. DeLonge said "from every ounce of my being" that he was meant to do this.

Hoppus and Barker decided to continue on without DeLonge, and enlisted Alkaline Trio vocalist/guitarist Matt Skiba to "fill in" for three shows in March 2015. Hoppus and Skiba had been wanting to work together musically for several years, so he was the first and only person considered for the role. After legal battles with DeLonge were worked out, Skiba joined Blink-182 as an official member and began preparations for new music. The resulting album, California, was produced by John Feldmann; the group's first new producer since longtime collaborator Jerry Finn. California was recorded between January and March 2016. The band, as well as Feldmann, would regularly spend "18 hours" in the studio a day, aiming to start and complete multiple songs in that timeframe. "We all wanted to write the best record that we could [...] It does feel like a new beginning. It feels like when we used to tour and sleep in the van because that's all we wanted to do is play rock music," said Hoppus.

Upon its July 2016 release, California became the band's second number-one album on the Billboard 200, and first in 15 years; it also reached the top for the first time in the United Kingdom. Its lead single, "Bored to Death", became the group's first number one single in 12 years. The band supported the album with a large headlining tour across North America between July and October 2016, and a European leg in June and July 2017. A deluxe edition of California—essentially a double album including songs left off the original album—was issued in 2017. California earned the band their first nomination for Best Rock Album at the Grammy Awards. Critical reviews of the album, however, were mixed; many considered Feldmann's input and the throwback nature of the songs as formulaic.

The trio moved from independent service BMG to major-label Columbia for their eighth studio effort, Nine (2019). While Nine builds upon their partnership with Feldmann, it also utilizes additional outside producers and songwriters. Musically, the LP augments the band's pop punk sound with hip hop-inspired programming, as well as electronics. In the interim, the trio embarked on a celebratory tour marking the twentieth anniversary of their breakthrough effort, Enema of the State. In recent years, each member has explored side projects as well. Skiba returned to Alkaline Trio for their ninth album, Is This Thing Cursed? (2018), while Hoppus formed Simple Creatures, an electropop outfit with All Time Low frontman Alex Gaskarth, with whom he released two EPs throughout 2019. Lastly, Barker has focused his energies in collaborating with rappers Lil Nas X, Machine Gun Kelly, and XXXTentacion, among others. Blink have also worked with several artists, jointly issuing singles with XXXTentacion, Lil Wayne, Goody Grace, Steve Aoki, Powfu, Oliver Tree, and the Chainsmokers.

On August 7, 2020, the band released a new single titled "Quarantine", which was recorded without Skiba's involvement due to lack of a home recording studio. Later in the same month, Hoppus stated that the band was working on a new EP scheduled for release in 2021, in addition to announcing a song with Juice Wrld—neither have been released. Though Barker had confirmed a 2021 release, the year ended without one.

Hoppus' cancer battle and DeLonge's second return (2021–present) 
On June 23, 2021, Hoppus confirmed that he had received a cancer diagnosis and had been receiving treatment in secret for the last three months. After his cancer diagnosis, it was reported by sources that Hoppus had met with DeLonge and Barker together at his home to discuss old problems, personal issues, and Hoppus' cancer diagnosis. Hoppus was declared cancer-free later that year, but would continue screening every six months.

Since DeLonge's departure, both fans and news outlets frequently speculated about when and if he would return to the band, with DeLonge himself remaining hopeful about eventually rejoining. However, speculations became much more frequent in the second half of 2022 when DeLonge updated his Instagram bio to once again include Blink-182 as one of the bands he plays in. Earlier that year as well, Skiba stated that he was unsure of his current status in the band, which continued to escalate the situation. Hoppus responded to the claims in his personal Discord server, stating that "there is no news to share," but didn't directly deny any of the claims. Shortly after, the band's Instagram account was completely wiped, and their website went under construction. Fans also began to find billboards and posters for the band in various cities around the world, while news outlets continued to speculate that DeLonge's return to the band could be announced soon. Following this, new promotional images of the band surfaced on ticketing websites, and on October 11, 2022, it was announced that DeLonge had officially rejoined the band. Alongside this announcement, it was revealed that the band planned to release a new album and embark on a world tour the following year, and would release a new song titled "Edging" on October 14, 2022. Following his return, DeLonge messaged Skiba on Instagram to thank him for his time with the band, and later shared the post publicly on his account. Skiba reciprocated and stated that he was grateful for his time in the band.

In December 2022, DeLonge revealed on his Instagram page that the new album was expected to come "in a few months".

In March 2023, DeLonge announced in an Instagram post that the Latin American leg of their tour (which was scheduled to begin that month) would be postponed to 2024 due to an injury sustained by Barker; he had dislocated a finger twice during rehearsals, with surgery and rest required to heal it. Consequently, the start of the band's tour as a whole was delayed to May 2023.

Musical style, lyrical themes, and influences
Blink-182's musical style is mainly considered pop-punk, a genre that combines influences of pop music with traditional punk rock. Throughout the band's career, though their sound has diversified, a large component of the band's music favors fast tempos, catchy melodies, prominent electric guitar with distortion, and power chord changes. Earlier albums by the band have also been tagged with the label skate punk, owing to the genre's most representative bands which they were influenced by and toured with. In addition, the band has also been classified under the umbrella of alternative rock as a whole. The band have claimed punk rock group the Descendents to be their greatest influence on a number of occasions. They have also named the Beatles, the Ramones, the Beach Boys, the Cure, Depeche Mode, U2, Stiff Little Fingers, All, Dinosaur Jr., NOFX, Bad Religion, Refused, Fugazi, Screeching Weasel, The Vandals, the Queers, and Jimmy Eat World as inspirations.

Common lyrical themes for the band involve relationships, suburbia, toilet humor, and teen angst. Hoppus and DeLonge, and later Skiba, split songwriting duty, and much of their lyrics tend toward autobiography. According to Nitsuh Abebe, of New York, the band's biggest recurring topic is maturity—"more specifically, their lack of it, their attitude toward their lack of it, or their eventual wide-eyed exploration of it". One of the band's biggest singles, "What's My Age Again?", specifically addresses the Peter Pan syndrome, while "Dammit", the band's first mainstream hit single, contains the hook "Well, I guess this is growing up." Albums such as Take Off Your Pants and Jacket near-exclusively deal in toilet humor and teen-centered lyrics, leading Rolling Stone to dub it a concept album chronicling adolescence. For Hoppus, these themes were not exclusively adolescent: "The things that happen to you in high school are the same things that happen your entire life. You can fall in love at sixty; you can get rejected at eighty." Mid-career albums, such as Neighborhoods (2011), explore darker territory, such as depression and loss. More recent efforts, like California (2016), aim for universality but also focus on miscommunication and loss of identity.

Musically, the band's sound has progressed throughout their 30-year career. Tom DeLonge's guitar style, which trades solos for riffs, is often down-stroked and power-chord heavy, with large amounts of palm muting. His later guitar work heavily delves into effects, exploring ambience and delay prominently. Many Blink songs center on the I–V–vi–IV progression. As a bassist, Hoppus is known for his well-defined midrange tone. Since the band is a trio, he approaches his role as a combination of being a rhythm guitarist and bassist. Early albums, such as Cheshire Cat (1995) and Dude Ranch (1997), were recorded with original drummer Scott Raynor, and consist of fast-paced, double-time songs. Drummer Travis Barker diversified the band's sound rhythmically when he joined in 1998. Throughout their discography, Barker's drumming references myriad musical genres, including Afro-Cuban music, bossa nova, reggae, and hip hop. Barker grew up playing in marching band, and it still influences his drum fills and kit setup.

Blink-182 were considered more radio-friendly than their predecessors. Jon Caramanica of The New York Times writes that the band "[took] punk's already playful core and [gave] it a shiny, accessible polish." Luke Lewis, writing for Total Guitar in 2003, summarized it aptly: "They wrote catchy songs, radio stations played them." The band's biggest hit, "All the Small Things", was written partially because DeLonge figured the label might want a song for radio. "It was obvious from the beginning it would fit that format," he told Lewis. "There's nothing wrong with that. We don't want obstacles between us and our audience." However, the band's conventional appeal, as well as partnerships with MTV, boardsport companies, and clothing brands, led to accusations that they were betraying the independent spirit of punk rock. DeLonge commented on the band's mainstream appeal in an interview in 2014:

Legacy

Blink-182 was one of the most popular rock bands at the turn of the millennium, and spearheaded the second wave of pop-punk and its journey into the mainstream. The glossy production instantly set Blink-182 apart from the other crossover punk acts of the era, such as Green Day. Its third LP Enema of the State catapulted the band to stardom, creating what New York Abebe described as a "blanket immersion among America's twenty-some million teenagers." At the band's commercial peak, albums such as Take Off Your Pants and Jacket and Enema  sold over 14 and 15 million copies worldwide, respectively. According to Kelefa Sanneh of The New Yorker, Blink-182 "spawned more imitators than any American rock band since Nirvana. Their seeming ordinariness convinced a generation of goofy punks that maybe they, too, could turn out deceptively simple songs as well constructed as anything on the pop chart. And their prankish camaraderie made fans feel like members of their extended social circle." Most Blink-182 songs are considered straightforward and easy to play on guitar, making them a popular choice of practice for beginner musicians. Lewis of Total Guitar notes that this was key in influencing a generation of kids to "pick up the guitar and form bands of their own."

Despite this, the band never received particularly glowing reviews, with many reviewers dismissing them as a joke. British publication NME was particularly critical of the trio, with reviewer Steven Wells begging them to "fuck right off," comparing them to "that sanitised, castrated, shrink-wrapped 'new wave' crap that the major US record companies pumped out circa 1981 in their belated attempt to jump on the 'punk' bandwagon." Nevertheless, subsequent reviews of the band's discography have been more positive. Andy Greenwald of Blender wrote, "the quick transformation from nudists to near geniuses is down-right astonishing." James Montgomery of MTV said that "despite their maturation, Blink never took themselves particularly seriously, which was another reason they were so accessible." A new generation of rock fans found the Blink sound "hugely influential," according to Nicole Frehsée of Rolling Stone. Sanneh concurred: in his 2021 book Major Labels, he calls the band a "generational touchstone", arguing their sound and humor aged gracefully.

In 2011, Jon Caramanica of The New York Times asserted that "no punk band of the 1990s has been more influential than Blink-182," stating that even as the band receded after their initial 2005 split, "its sound and style could be heard in the muscular pop punk of Fall Out Boy or in the current wave of high-gloss Warped Tour punk bands, like All Time Low and The Maine." Montgomery concurs: "...without them, there'd be no Fall Out Boy, no Paramore, or no Fueled by Ramen Records." Maria Sherman of The Village Voice took this a step further, writing "Apart from the sound, Blink's ideology has been popularized [...] their presence is everywhere." "When it comes to having inestimable influence, Blink-182 might well be contemporary punk's version of the Beatles", wrote Scott Heisel in a 2009 Alternative Press cover story on the band. The same magazine later ranked Blink the fourth of the "30 Most Influential Bands of the Past 30 Years," just behind Radiohead, Fugazi, and Nirvana. Bands such as Panic! at the Disco and All Time Low originated covering Blink-182 songs, while You Me at Six, and 5 Seconds of Summer have also named the band as influences. "Anyone in our genre would be lying if they said they weren't influenced by Blink-182," said Joel Madden of Good Charlotte. The band's influence extends beyond punk and pop-punk groups as well: the band has been cited as an influence by Avril Lavigne, Best Coast, DIIV, FIDLAR, Grimes,
Male Bonding, Neck Deep, Mumford & Sons, A Day to Remember, Owl City, Charly Bliss, Tucker Beathard, Joyce Manor, Wavves, and the Chainsmokers; the latter even mentioned the band in the lyrics of their number-one hit song "Closer".

In 2019, Blink-182's song 'All the Small Things' became the theme song of the Colorado Avalanche.

Band members

Current members
 Mark Hoppus – bass guitar, vocals 
 Tom DeLonge – guitars, vocals 
 Travis Barker – drums, percussion 

Former members
 Scott Raynor – drums, percussion, guitar, vocals 
 Matt Skiba – guitars, vocals 

Former touring musicians
 Cam Jones – bass guitar 
 Mike Krull – drums 
 Byron McMackin – drums 
 Josh Freese – drums 
 Damon DeLaPaz – drums 
 Brooks Wackerman – drums 

Timeline

Discography

Studio albums
 Cheshire Cat (1995)
 Dude Ranch (1997)
 Enema of the State (1999)
 Take Off Your Pants and Jacket (2001)
 Blink-182 (2003)
 Neighborhoods (2011)
 California (2016)
 Nine (2019)

Tours
Headlining

 PooPoo PeePee Tour (1998)
 Loserkids Tour (1999)
 Honda Civic Tour 2001 (2001)
 The Mark, Tom and Travis Show Tour (2000–2001)
 Take Off Your Pants and Jacket Tour (2001)
 DollaBill Tour (2003)
 Blink-182 Tour (2003–2004)
 Blink-182 in Concert (2009–2010)
 20th Anniversary Tour (2011–2014)
 We Are Pirates Tour (2016)
 California Tour (2016–2017)
 Kings of the Weekend Tour (2018)
 World Tour 2023/2024 (2023–2024)

Co-headlining
 Pop Disaster Tour (with Green Day) (2002)
 Summer Tour 2004 (with No Doubt) (2004)
 10th Annual Honda Civic Tour (with My Chemical Romance) (2011)
 Blink-182 and Lil Wayne Tour (with Lil Wayne) (2019)

Awards and nominations

References

Bibliography

External links

 
 

 
Alternative rock groups from California
American musical trios
Articles which contain graphical timelines
Kerrang! Awards winners
MCA Records artists
MTV Europe Music Award winners
Musical groups disestablished in 2005
Musical groups established in 1992
Musical groups from San Diego
Musical groups reestablished in 2009
People from Poway, California
Pop punk groups from California
Punk rock groups from California
Skate punk groups
American punk rock groups